Ivar Waller (11 June 1898 – 12 April 1991) was a Swedish professor of theoretical physics at Uppsala University. He developed the theory of X-ray scattering by lattice vibrations of a crystal, building upon the prior work of Peter Debye. The Debye–Waller factor, which he introduced in his doctoral thesis in 1925, is the definitive treatment of the effect of thermal vibrations in X-ray crystallography. He was a member of the Royal Swedish Academy of Sciences from 1945, and the Nobel Committee for Physics 1945-1972.

One of his notable doctoral students was the quantum chemist Per-Olov Löwdin.

External links
 Obituary in Journal of Applied Crystallography, 1992

1898 births
1991 deaths
Swedish physicists
Academic staff of Uppsala University
Members of the Royal Swedish Academy of Sciences
Burials at Uppsala old cemetery
Members of the Royal Society of Sciences in Uppsala